Goodmans is a British consumer electronics company which is part of Harvard International.

Founded in London, in 1923, the company started as a manufacturer of loudspeakers for public address systems.

Production and engineering was based in Wembley and latterly in Havant, Hampshire.

From the 1960s Goodmans extended their product into amplifiers with the introduction of the Maxamp30, the first British made solid state amplifier.  Throughout the 1970s and 1980s Goodmans continued to develop loudspeakers, amplifiers, tuners and receivers.

From the late 1980s Goodmans diversified into wider consumer electronics including in-car entertainment, personal CD, digital TV and Freeview & Freesat Digital TV receivers & recorders.

Goodmans was the shirt sponsor of the English football team Portsmouth F.C. from 1989 to 1995.

Product range
Goodmans Industries Ltd markets a wide range of consumer electronics, predominantly focused in audio, including soundbars, digital radios and connected audio speakers.  They launched their first Digital Radio, GPS280, in 2003 and their first HD ready TV on 27 July 2007.

Goodmans was a launch partner of Freesat, releasing their first High Definition Freesat Set Top Box in 2008.

Goodmans launched the world's first talking Set Top Box, Goodmans SmartTalk GDB20TTS, as part of a collaboration with RNIB in 2010.

The Goodmans brand is licensed to B&M for use on domestic appliances.

References

External links

Goodmans at B&M Stores

Electronics companies of the United Kingdom
British brands
Manufacturing companies of the United Kingdom
Radio manufacturers